Isaac Mulatya Muoki is a Kenyan politician. He belongs to the Orange Democratic Movement – Kenya and was elected to represent the Kitui South Constituency in the National Assembly of Kenya from 2007 Kenyan parliamentary election to 2013. It is his second stint as an MP, previously he won the constituency seat in 1992, then representing the KANU party

References

Living people
Year of birth missing (living people)
Wiper Democratic Movement – Kenya politicians
Kenya African National Union politicians
Members of the National Assembly (Kenya)